The following highways are numbered 668:

United States